Opheim may refer to:
Opheim (surname), several people
Opheim, Norway, a village in Ål. Buskerud County, Norway
Opheim, Montana, a town in Valley County, Montana
Opheim Air Force Station a former US Air Force facility near Opheim, Montana
Opheim Hills, a range of Hills near Opheim, Montana

See also
Ophiem, Illinois